The Journal of Interpersonal Violence (JIV) is a peer-reviewed, academic journal that publishes papers in the field of interpersonal violence, and focuses on the study of victims and perpetrators of interpersonal violence. The journal's editor-in-chief is Jon R. Conte (University of Washington). It was established in 1986 and is currently published by SAGE Publications.

Abstracting and indexing 
The Journal of Interpersonal Violence is abstracted and indexed in Scopus and the Social Sciences Citation Index. According to the Journal Citation Reports, its 2020 impact factor is 6.144.

References

External links 
 

SAGE Publishing academic journals
English-language journals
Criminology journals
Publications established in 1986
Monthly journals
Violence journals